David Dennis Warmack (December 19, 1947 – July 6, 2017) was an American football coach. He served as the head football coach at Kalamazoo College in Kalamazoo, Michigan for eight seasons, from 1990 to 1997, compiling a record of 33–38–1.

Warmack was born on December 19, 1947, in Kalamazoo, Michigan. He earned a Bachelor of Arts degree from Western Michigan University and master's degree from Central Connecticut State University. Warmack died on July 6, 2017, in Paw Paw, Michigan, after suffering from cancer.

Head coaching record

College

References

1947 births
2017 deaths
Central Connecticut Blue Devils football coaches
Kalamazoo Hornets football coaches
Kalamazoo Hornets football players
Wabash Little Giants football coaches
High school football coaches in Michigan
Central Connecticut State University alumni
Western Michigan University alumni
Sportspeople from Kalamazoo, Michigan
Coaches of American football from Michigan
Deaths from cancer in Michigan